Lake Băneasa is a reservoir on the Colentina River at Băneasa in Sector 1 of Bucharest, Romania.

See also
List of lakes in Bucharest

References

Baneasa
Băneasa